The Indy Lights Grand Prix of Indianapolis is a pair of twin races in the Cooper Tire Indy Lights Series, held on the road course at the Indianapolis Motor Speedway. It is held as a support race to the Brickyard 400 of the NASCAR Cup Series.

The race was previously known as the Liberty Challenge from 2005 to 2007. It originally was held as a support race to the United States Grand Prix, and from 2014 to 2019, it was part of the IndyCar Series.  For 2020, as a result of the COVID-19 pandemic, the race be on its own weekend September 3–4, as neither road course weekend was suitable.

Race history
For the first three years of its existence, the Indy Pro Series was contested on oval tracks only. This was also true of the parent IndyCar Series, at the time. All Indy Pro Series races were run as support to IndyCar Series events. Road course and street course events were added to both series in 2005, and the series became known as Indy Lights in 2008.

In 2005, the series added the Liberty Challenge, as a support race to the Formula One United States Grand Prix at Indianapolis. This move allowed the Indy Pro Series drivers valuable exposure in front of the Formula One teams and fans. Some drivers, such as Graham Rahal, ran this race as a one-off, while running other series (such as the Champ Car Atlantics).

The Liberty Challenge was the only Indy Pro Series race at the time which was not run as support to an IndyCar Series weekend. Also, the Indy Pro Series became the only racing series to hold races on both the oval and road course tracks at the Indianapolis Motor Speedway. The Freedom 100 has been held on the oval since 2003. In 2007, a twin race format was introduced. After 2007, the U.S Grand Prix left Indianapolis, and the Liberty Challenge race was put on hiatus.

In 2014, the race was revived as part of the new IndyCar Grand Prix weekend, where all four IndyCar-sanctioned divisions participate in races on the road course during the first weekend of the Indianapolis 500 race meeting. In addition, the Indy Lights began utilizing the newer road course layout used by the IndyCar Series.

Race results

Qualification Results

Event Records

Previous course layouts

References

Sources
Indy Lights stats
Champ Car Stats – Indy Pro Series 

Formula races
Indy Lights
Auto races in the United States
Motorsport in Indianapolis